Bill Hume may refer to:
 Bill Hume (footballer)
 Bill Hume (cartoonist)